Džindići may refer to:
 Džindići (Goražde), a suburb of Goražde, Bosnia and Herzegovina
 Džindići (Sokolac), a village in Sokolac, Bosnia and Herzegovina